John Morris (27 September 1923 – 6 April 2011) was an English footballer who played as an inside forward in the Football League for Manchester United, Derby County and Leicester City.

Morris was born in Radcliffe, Lancashire. He started his career as a trainee with Manchester United in 1939, and turned professional in 1941. He guested for clubs including Bolton Wanderers, Charlton Athletic, Wrexham, and Everton during the Second World War, and made his debut for Manchester United on 26 October 1946 in a 3–0 home win against Sunderland in the First Division. He helped the club win the 1948 FA Cup, then, after scoring 35 goals from 93 appearances in all competitions, he was transferred to Derby County in March 1949 for a world record fee of £24,000. After three seasons at Derby, he finished his League career with Leicester City, where he made more than 200 appearances, and then became player-manager of non-league club Corby Town.

Morris was capped three times for England. He scored on his debut, on 18 May 1949 in a 4–1 win against Norway, and scored twice in his second game four days later against France.

Later life and death
Morris continued to attend functions for the Former Players' Association of Derby County and also played golf regularly into his 80s. He died on 6 April 2011 in a Manchester Nursing home at the age of 87. He was survived by his wife Marian and his two sons, and outlived his only daughter. His granddaughterJenny still talks about him in Woolies club every Saturday.

References

External links
 
 
 Obituary in The Independent

1923 births
2011 deaths
People from Radcliffe, Greater Manchester
English footballers
England international footballers
Association football inside forwards
Manchester United F.C. players
Derby County F.C. players
Leicester City F.C. players
Corby Town F.C. players
English Football League players
Bolton Wanderers F.C. wartime guest players
Charlton Athletic F.C. wartime guest players
Everton F.C. wartime guest players
Wrexham F.C. wartime guest players
English football managers
Kettering Town F.C. players
Corby Town F.C. managers
English Football League representative players
Oswestry Town F.C. managers
FA Cup Final players